Snowballing often refers to a situation which rapidly gets out of control, as when a snow ball grows larger while rolling downhill.

Snowballing might also refer to:

Behavior 
 Snowballing (sexual practice), the act of spitting semen into a partner's mouth after oral sex

Economy 
 A situation in which the exercise of stop orders in a declining market or advancing market or specific share creates further downward or upward pressure, triggering more stop orders, magnifying the decline or advance
 Debt-snowball method: A method of paying down credit card debt by paying the minimum on all balances, except the one with the highest interest rate

Games 
 The throwing of snowballs
 A PvP element in the winter event of the online role-playing game series Guild Wars
 When an enemy faction or group keeps gaining territory and becomes unstoppable

Science and engineering 
 In social science research, snowball sampling, or "snowballing": a technique for developing a research sample
 In researching a field, snowballing is another name for Pearl growing
 In chemical and industrial engineering, snowballing is the second and last phase, after aggregation, of the pelletization process.

Other uses 
 Bataille de boules de neige, an 1896 French silent film also known as Snowballing

See also
 Snowball (disambiguation)
 Snowball, a spherical object made from snow